Olajuwon is a surname of Yoruba origin. Notable people with the surname include:

 Abi Olajuwon (born 1988), American basketball player and coach, daughter of Hakeem
 Hakeem Olajuwon (born 1963), Nigerian-American basketball player

Yoruba-language surnames